The 2001 Columbia Lions football team was an American football team that represented Columbia University during the 2001 NCAA Division I-AA football season. Columbia tied for fourth in the Ivy League. 

In their 13th season under head coach Ray Tellier, the Lions compiled a 3–7 record and were outscored 326 to 206. Sloane Joseph, Brian Lysiak, Jeff McCall and Johnathan Reese were the team captains.  

The Lions' 3–4 conference record tied for fourth in the Ivy League standings. Columbia was outscored 231 to 162 by Ivy opponents. 

When the September 11 attacks disrupted the opening weekend of Ivy League football, Columbia was the last league member to cancel its scheduled game, making the announcement on Friday afternoon just 24 hours before kickoff. The Lions and crosstown rival Fordham Rams had initially hoped to play the game as a sign of New York City resiliency.

Unlike the other Ivy League teams, which played a nine-game schedule in 2001, Columbia chose to reschedule its canceled game and add it to the end of the year, on Thursday, November 22. This was the first time in nearly 40 years that Columbia had played an opponent other than Brown University in its season-ender, and played a game on Thanksgiving Day; it did both in 1963, when the final game of the season was rescheduled following the assassination of John F. Kennedy.

Columbia played its homes games at Lawrence A. Wien Stadium in Upper Manhattan, in New York City.

Schedule

References

Columbia
Columbia Lions football seasons
Columbia Lions football